Lisa Gallagher may refer to:

 Lisa Gallagher, character in A Killing Spring
Lisa Gallagher, political candidate for Brandon—Souris
Lisa Gallagher, presenter on BBC Look North (East Yorkshire and Lincolnshire)